Chuen Shui Tseng is a village in Lam Tsuen, Tai Po District, Hong Kong.

Recognised status
Chuen Shui Tseng is a recognised village under the New Territories Small House Policy.

References

Villages in Tai Po District, Hong Kong
Lam Tsuen